Sveta Ana v Slovenskih Goricah is a settlement in the Municipality of Sveta Ana in the Slovene Hills in northeastern Slovenia.

Parish church
The parish church, from which the settlement also gets its name, is dedicated to Saint Anne. It also features in the coat of arms of the municipality. It was built between 1693 and 1705 and renovated in the 19th century.

References

External links
 
 Sveta Ana v Slovenskih Goricah on Geopedia

Populated places in the Municipality of Sveta Ana